The Còpia de Palomes is a mountain located in Catalonia, Spain. It is situated between the municipalities of Rubió and Òdena, in the comarca of the Anoia, province of Barcelona. It is the highest mountain in the Serra de Rubió.

References 

Mountains of Catalonia